Sikensi is a town in southeastern Ivory Coast. It is a sub-prefecture of and the seat of Sikensi Department in Agnéby-Tiassa Region, Lagunes District. Sikensi is also a commune.

In 2021, the population of the sub-prefecture of Sikensi was 91,032.

Villages
The 13 villages of the sub-prefecture of Sikensi and their populations in 2014 are:

References

Sub-prefectures of Agnéby-Tiassa
Communes of Agnéby-Tiassa